Nilphamari is a city in Bangladesh. It could also refer to the following other places in Bangladesh:

 Nilphamari District
 Nilphamari Sadar Upazila
 Nilphamari-1, an assembly constituency
 Nilphamari-2, an assembly constituency
 Nilphamari-3, an assembly constituency
 Nilphamari-4, an assembly constituency